1, rue Sésame (translates to: 1 Sesame Street) is a French children's television series based on the popular U.S. children's program Sesame Street. The show first aired on 4 January 1978, at 6:00 a.m. on TF1. Its musical director was Roger Elcourt, composer Jean Morlier.

The series was executive produced by Michel Berthier from TF1 and Lutrelle Horne from CTW. The show ran for a total of 82 episodes and ceased production in June 1982.

The series is occasionally called Bonjour Sésame, or la Rue Sésame. In October 2005, a new series by Sesame Workshop was launched, called 5, Rue Sésame.

Characters
 Toccata, a white feathered bird, almost a goose-hawk-ostrich-like hybrid (voiced and puppeteered by Lucien Morisse)
 Mordicus, a furless grouch (voiced and puppeteered by Georges Mosca)
 Trepido, a pink snail
 Ernest et Bart (Ernie and Bert)
 Clémence (Monique Tarbes)
 Odile (Edith Garnier)
 Roger (Roger Elcourt)
 Maxime (Maxime Arcos)
 Dominé (René Lafleur)
 Children Fabienne (Fabienne Dauvin) and Rodrigue (Rodrigue Mallet)

External links
  De Casimir à Goldorak: 1, rue Sésame fan site

French preschool education television series
1970s preschool education television series
1980s preschool education television series
1970s French television series
1980s French television series
1978 French television series debuts
1982 French television series endings
Sesame Street international co-productions
French television shows featuring puppetry